Discula rotula is a species of air-breathing land snail, a terrestrial pulmonate gastropod mollusk in the family Geomitridae.

Habitat 
This species is endemic to the Porto Santo Island, Madeira, Portugal, where it can be found under rocks.

Description 
The shell of this snail has a discoid shape with small transversal grooves and some granules scattered along the sutures. This brownish-yellow shell is somewhat concave at its base. The oblique aperture has an oval shape. The shell is characteristic by its horizontal stripe on the last body whorl and two stripes at its base.

External links 
photo of Discula rotula

Molluscs of Madeira
Discula
Taxa named by Richard Thomas Lowe
Gastropods described in 1831